Joseph Henry Kayes is a professional water polo player. He was born on 3 January 1991 in New Zealand.

He is of Samoan descent through his mother, as both his maternal grandparents were born in Samoa.

Kayes played for the NZ Senior Men's Water Polo team in 2008. In 2009 he went to Perth where he played for the Fremantle Mariners Men's Water Polo team which won the Australian National League. 
In October 2009 he was playing water polo as a full professional at the Szeged club in Hungary where he stayed for four seasons. He was mentored as a Centre Forward by Tamas Molnar, a three time Olympic Gold medal winner for Hungary. Joe won 2 Hungarian Cup Gold medals with Szeged along with 3 bronze medals in the Hungarian National League.

In 2014 he played again for Fremantle in Australia. 2014/2015 – he now plays for OSC in Budapest, once again in the Hungarian National League.

In 2015 he obtained Australian citizenship and was then approved to play for Australia men's national water polo team at the 2016 Summer Olympics.

References

Living people
1991 births
New Zealand male water polo players
New Zealand expatriate sportspeople in Australia
Australian male water polo players
Water polo players at the 2016 Summer Olympics
Olympic water polo players of Australia